The 1941 Alabama Crimson Tide football team (variously "Alabama", "UA" or "Bama") represented the University of Alabama in the 1941 college football season. It was the Crimson Tide's 48th overall and 9th season as a member of the Southeastern Conference (SEC). The team was led by head coach Frank Thomas, in his 11th year, and played their home games at Denny Stadium in Tuscaloosa and Legion Field in Birmingham, Alabama. They finished the season with a record of nine wins and two losses (9–2 overall, 5–2 in the SEC) and with a victory in the Cotton Bowl Classic over Texas A&M. Alabama also claims a share of the 1941 national championship due to its selection as national champion by the Houlgate System.

The Crimson Tide opened the 1941 season with a non-conference victory over Southwestern Louisiana but lost to Mississippi State in the second game of the season. Alabama rebounded with six consecutive victories over Howard, Tennessee, Georgia, Kentucky, Tulane and Georgia Tech. As they entered their game against Vanderbilt, the Crimson Tide was ranked No. 7 in the AP Poll, but were upset 7–0 in Nashville. Alabama then closed the regular season with a road victory over Miami and defeated Texas A&M in the Cotton Bowl Classic.

Schedule

Game summaries

Southwestern Louisiana

Source:

To open the 1941 season, Alabama defeated the Southwestern Louisiana Institute Bulldogs (now known as the Louisiana–Lafayette Ragin' Cajuns) 47–6 at Denny Stadium. Alabama took a 13–0 first quarter lead after touchdowns were scored on a short Paul Spencer run and on a 9-yard Jimmy Nelson run. The Bulldogs then responded early in the second quarter with their only points on an 11-yard Bobby Voitier touchdown pass to William Bernhard. The Crimson Tide then played their second line and Don Salls scored their third touchdown of the afternoon on a 6-yard run to give Alabama a 20–6 halftime lead. In the second half, Louisiana was shut out and the Crimson Tide added two touchdowns in each of the final two quarters for the 47–6 win. Third-quarter touchdowns were scored by Dave Brown on a 6-yard run and by Spencer on a 7-yard run; fourth-quarter touchdowns were scored after Wheeler Leeth blocked a Bulldogs punt that was returned 15-yards by Joe Chorba and on a short Louie Scales run. The victory was Alabama's first against the Bulldogs and also marked the return of former Crimson Tide All-American Johnny Cain to Tuscaloosa as head coach of Southwestern Louisiana.

Mississippi State

Source:

In the first conference game of the season, Alabama was shut out 14–0 by the Mississippi State Maroons on homecoming at Denny Stadium for the second consecutive year. After a scoreless first half, the Maroons scored a touchdown in each of the final two quarters. Touchdowns were scored on a 19-yard Bill Murphy pass to Robert Patterson in the third and on a short Bruce run in the fourth. The loss brought Alabama's all-time record against Mississippi State to 19–7–2.

Howard

Source:

In the first Legion Field game of the season, Alabama defeated Howard (now Samford University) 61–0. The Crimson Tide took a 13–0 halftime lead after touchdowns were scored on a 1-yard Don Salls run in the first and on an 8-yard reverse by Dave Brown in the second. Alabama extended their lead further to 27–0 in the third with touchdowns by Jimmy Nelson on a 95-yard kickoff return and then on a 13-yard run. The Crimson Tide then closed the game with five fourth-quarter touchdowns for the 61–0 win. Touchdowns in the fourth were scored by Carl Mims on runs of 26, 6 and 18-yards, Ted McKosky on a 37-yard run and on a Ted Cook touchdown reception. The victory improved Alabama's all-time record against Howard to 19–0–1.

Tennessee

Source:

At Knoxville, Alabama defeated rival Tennessee 9–2 to end a three-game losing streak against the Volunteers. Alabama scored all of their points in the first half for a 9–0 lead on a 21-yard George Hecht field goal in the first and on a 2-yard Don Salls touchdown run in the second. Tennessee scored their only points in the third quarter on a safety to prevent a shutout. Jimmy Nelson starred on defense with his three interceptions during the game. The victory improved Alabama's all-time record against Tennessee to 14–8–2.

Georgia

Source:

At Legion Field, Alabama defeated the Georgia Bulldogs 27–14 in what was their first meeting since the 1935 season. The Crimson Tide took a 13–0 first quarter lead on a Jimmy Nelson touchdown pass to Holt Rast and on a 1-yard Nelson run. The Bulldogs responded in the first two minutes of the second quarter with a Heyward Allen to Lamar Davis touchdown pass. However, Alabama responded to make the halftime lead 20–7 after Paul Spencer scored on a 1-yard run late in the second quarter. Alabama then scored their final points late in the third when Nelson intercepted a Frank Sinkwich pass and returned it 54 yards for a 27–7 lead. A late Allen to Jerry Nunnally touchdown pass made the final score 27–14. The victory improved Alabama's all-time record against Georgia to 14–11–3.

Kentucky

Source:

After their victory over Georgia, Alabama entered the polls for the first time of the season at the No. 15 position. On what was homecoming in Tuscaloosa, the Crimson Tide shutout Kentucky 30–0, and scored at least one touchdown in all four quarters. First half touchdowns were scored by Jimmy Nelson on a 20-yard run in the first and on a 22-yard pass from Russ Mosley to George Weeks in the second. Second half touchdowns were scored on a Nelson to Holt Rast reception in the third and on both a 25-yard Howard Hughes to Carl Mims pass and on a 23-yard Frank Martin run. The victory improved Alabama's all-time record against Kentucky 19–1–1.

Tulane

Source:

The Crimson Tide defeated the Green Wave 19–14 with a fourth-quarter touchdown to take the lead before a crowd of 50,000 at Tulane Stadium. Alabama scored first when Jimmy Nelson took a Bob Glass punt and then handed it to Dave Brown who returned it 60 yards for a touchdown. Tulane then took a 7–6 lead later in the first on a 25-yard Lou Thomas touchdown pass to Gordon English, and extended it to 14–6 at halftime when Thomas threw his second touchdown of the afternoon to Bob Grush. Alabama responded in the third with a 3-yard Nelson to Holt Rast touchdown pass and with the game-winning points on a 2-yard Don Salls touchdown run in the fourth. The victory improved Alabama's all-time record against Tulane to 14–4–1.

Georgia Tech

Source:

Prior to their final home game of the season against Georgia Tech, Alabama moved up from the No. 13 position to the No. 9 position in the AP Poll. Against the Yellow Jackets, the Crimson Tide won with a 20–0 shutout at Legion Field. After a scoreless first quarter, Alabama scored one touchdown in each of the three remaining quarters in the victory. Howard Hughes scored in the second on a 2-yard run, Jimmy Nelson scored on a 68-yard punt return in the third and Nelson threw a 4-yard touchdown pass to Russ Craft in the fourth. The victory improved Alabama's all-time record against Georgia Tech to 13–11–3.

Vanderbilt

Source:

After their victory over Georgia Tech, Alabama moved up two spots to the No. 7 position in the AP Poll prior to their game against Vanderbilt. In their game against the Commodores, Alabama lost 7–0 in rainy and muddy conditions on the road at Dudley Field. The only points of the game came in the third quarter when Art Rebrovich threw a 25-yard touchdown pass to Jack Jenkins. The loss brought Alabama's all-time record against Vanderbilt to 13–10.

Miami

Source:

After their loss to Vanderbilt, Alabama moved down eleven spots to the No. 18 position in the AP Poll prior to their game against Miami. In their game against the Hurricanes on a Friday evening, Alabama won 21–7 in what was the first all-time meeting between the schools. After an 85-yard punt return by Jimmy Nelson brought the ball to the Miami 5-yard line, Russ Craft scored on a 5-yard reverse for a 7–0 Alabama lead. Howard Plasman tied the game at 7–7 on the ensuing possession with his 2-yard touchdown run. The Crimson Tide retook the lead in the second on a 28-yard Dave Brown touchdown run and then scored again in the third quarter on a Nelson run for the 21–7 victory.

Texas A&M

Source:

In the 1942 Cotton Bowl Classic against Texas A&M, Alabama was outgained 309 yards to 75 and earned just one official first down, but were able to win the game 29–21. In the game, Alabama's defense forced 12 turnovers (seven interceptions and five fumbles). The Crimson Tide scored a touchdown on a 72-yard punt return, a 12-yard interception return, scored two touchdowns after recovering A&M fumbles on the A&M 21 and 24-yard lines and kicked a field goal after they intercepted a pass on the Texas A&M 17.

National championship claim
In the 1980s, Alabama claimed the 1941 championship as one of its claimed/recognized national championships.  As such, Alabama claims a share of the 1941 national championship, with Minnesota, due to each school being selected national champion by at least one selector. Specifically, Alabama was selected national champion in 1941 by the Houlgate System. The Houlgate System was a mathematical ranking system devised by Dale Houlgate that was syndicated in newspapers between 1927 and 1958 to determine the national champion and is recognized by the NCAA as a "major selector" of national championships. Alabama lost 2 games and finished 3rd in the SEC below Tennessee and conference champion Mississippi State (8-1) who defeated Alabama 14-0 that season.

Personnel

Varsity letter winners

Coaching staff

After the season

NFL Draft
Several players that were varsity lettermen from the 1941 squad were drafted into the National Football League (NFL) between the 1942 and 1944 drafts. These players included the following:

References
General

 

Specific

Alabama
Alabama Crimson Tide football seasons
College football national champions
Cotton Bowl Classic champion seasons
Alabama Crimson Tide football